Sacandaga Lake (sa-kuhn-DAH-ga) is a lake in the Town of Lake Pleasant in Hamilton County, New York approximately  west of Speculator. The outlet is a channel that leads to Lake Pleasant, which is the source of the Sacandaga River.

Moffitt Beach State Campground is a popular camping site on the lake.

Fishing
Fish species present in the lake are brown trout, brook trout, smallmouth bass, walleye, pickerel, and brown bullhead. There is a state owned public access with parking for 30 trucks and trailers.

References

External links
 Map  of Sacandaga Lake

Lakes of New York (state)
Lakes of Hamilton County, New York